St. Patrick Catholic School, also called St. Patrick Parish School, is a private Catholic school located at 3700 Garden Avenue, Miami Beach, Florida. It is the parish school for the St. Patrick Catholic Church.

History
In 1926, Monsignor William Barry and five Dominican sisters from Adrian, Michigan changed five polo stables that Carl G. Fisher had donated to the parish into five classrooms and a cafeteria.

Due to the damage caused by the September 17, 1926 hurricane to the school buildings, the school did not open until two weeks after the hurricane had passed. Also, only 20 of the 150 students registered prior to the hurricane attended on opening day.

In 1927, two more classrooms were added. There was only one high school graduate in the class of 1927, 1928, and 1929, and only three graduates in 1930.

A $75,000 building permit was issued on May 31, 1930, for St. Patrick Catholic Elementary and High School. The first of three units opened in September of the two-story school building, which was completed in 1932.

Accreditation in the Southern Association of Colleges and Schools became a reality in 1933, along with the acceptance by the State of Florida.

The last 12th grade graduation was in 1972 and there were 37 graduates. The school continues to provide education from Kindergarten to 8th grade. 

In 1976, the school was first accredited by the Florida Catholic Conference. In 1988, it was named a "National School of Excellence" by the U.S. Department of Education. Mrs. Bertha Moro is the school principal.

Leadership
Below are lists of individuals who have led the school.

First Five Sisters at School (1926)
Sister Miriam Fenner
Sister Francis Margaret Grix
Sister Jane Catherine Hauser
Sister Blanche Kelly
Sister Leo Clare Thornton

Principals
Sister Blanche Kelly (1926–1930)
Sister Leo Clare Thornton (1930–1936)
Sister Ann Terence McClear (1936–1942)
Sister Rose Ann McIntosh (1942–1946)
Sister Mary Aurelia Gray (1946–1952) -- Grade School
Sister Hildegarde Brennan (1946–1952) -- High School
Sister John Therese Singer (1952–1958)
Sister Marcella Gardner (1958–1964)
Sister Hildegarde Brennan (1961–1962) -- High School
Sister Patricia Ellen (Mary June) Secor (1964–1972) -- Grade School
Sister Hildegarde Brennan (1964–1966) -- High School
Sister Ann Catherine Gleason (1966–1970) -- High School
Sister Mary June Secor (1970–1972) -- High School
Sister Jean Elizabeth Nugent (1972–1979) -- Grade School
Sister Eva (1979–1980)
Sister Eva [regent principal] (1980–1982)
Sister Enedina Rodriguez (1982–1983)
Mrs. Christine Lamadrid (1983–1994)
Sister Winifred (1994–1996)
Mrs. Josephine Kenna (1996–2000)
Mrs. Bertha Moro (2000–Present)

References

External links
 St. Patrick Catholic School website

Buildings and structures in Miami Beach, Florida
Roman Catholic Archdiocese of Miami
Private elementary schools in Miami-Dade County, Florida
Private middle schools in Miami-Dade County, Florida
K–8 schools in Florida
Catholic elementary schools in Florida
Educational institutions established in 1926
1926 establishments in Florida